The Church of the Heavenly Rest is an Episcopal church located on the corner of Fifth Avenue and 90th Street, opposite Central Park and the Carnegie Mansion, on the Upper East Side of New York City. The church is noted for the architecture of its building, location on Museum Mile, Outreach, Thrift, Music and Arts programs, and for some of its congregation members.

In 2020, it reported 1,866 members but no figures for attendance or plate and pledge income.

Congregation history

The church was founded in 1865 (officially established in 1868) by American Civil War veterans, with the assistance of the Reverend Robert Shaw Howland. It was meant as a memorial to soldiers who had died in the American Civil War. By 1900, the church had amassed close to 1000 members. The church was originally located on Fifth Avenue and 46th Street before moving to its present site.

Present church building
The land for the current site was sold to the church in 1926 by Louise Whitfield Carnegie, Andrew Carnegie's widow. Carnegie purchased the site in 1917 for $1.7 million shortly after a sign was erected reading "for sale without restrictions", his ownership prevented apartment house development there that would intrude on his mansion's surroundings, but the site remained undeveloped with only a few billboards and a lemonade stand on one of the city's most expensive addresses. Its subsequent sale to the church carried the restrictions that the land could only be used "for a Christian church no higher than 75 feet, exclusive of steeple" through 1975.

The limestone church was designed in the neo-Gothic style by the firm Mayers, Murray & Phillip, successors to Bertram Goodhue. Goodhue died before the first stone was laid. Mayers Murray & Phillip took over construction. It opened Easter Day 1929, seating 1,050, at a cost of $3.2 million. Sculpture was to be executed by Malvina Hoffman, Lee Lawrie, and other artists. The architecture and sculpture combined Neo-Gothic styles with Art deco details. However, over two-thirds of the sculptural program was never executed; sculptor Janet Scudder withdrew from a commission in 1928 after it was downsized. The Stock Market Crash of 1929 ended other work and the blocky limestone facade was retained without sculpture.

Innovative design features included unobstructed views of the altar, indirect lighting and a high-tech sound system.  The building was listed on the National Register of Historic Places in 2021.

Music program
The church has a number of choirs, including boys' and girls', a mixed adult choir, and a bell choir.  For its patronal feast, which is All Saints' Day, the hymns "For All the Saints" and "I Sing a Song of the Saints of God" are commonly sung.

Notable people
President Chester A. Arthur's funeral took place there.

In popular culture

The church is featured in a scene in the 1997 film The Devil's Advocate starring Keanu Reeves. In the film, Kevin finds his wife Mary Ann sitting on a bench in the church, where Mary Ann reveals her naked body to be covered in cuts and bruises, accusing Milton (Satan) of raping her.

References

External links
 
 

Churches in Manhattan
Churches completed in 1929
20th-century Episcopal church buildings
Gothic Revival church buildings in New York City
Episcopal church buildings in New York City
Religious organizations established in 1865
Fifth Avenue
Upper East Side
1865 establishments in New York (state)
Properties of religious function on the National Register of Historic Places in Manhattan